The Ernest W. Smith House is a historic house located at 272 S. Los Robles Ave. in Pasadena, California. Prominent Pasadena architects Greene & Greene designed the American Craftsman house in 1910. The house was one of the last designed by Greene & Greene; however, its simple design is reminiscent of their earlier work. The house's interlocking gable roof with wide eaves was inspired by the Swiss chalet style, a design which Greene & Greene often incorporated into their work. The house's design also features exposed rafter tails, a full-length front porch, casement windows, and a wood shingle roof, all typical elements of Greene & Greene designs.

The house was added to the National Register of Historic Places on January 14, 1998.

References

Buildings and structures on the National Register of Historic Places in Pasadena, California
Houses completed in 1910
Houses on the National Register of Historic Places in California
Houses in Pasadena, California
American Craftsman architecture in California
Greene and Greene buildings